The 1952 Southern 500, the third running of the event, was a NASCAR Grand National Series event that was held on September 1, 1952, at Darlington Raceway in Darlington, South Carolina.

Background
Darlington Raceway, nicknamed by many NASCAR fans and drivers as "The Lady in Black" or "The Track Too Tough to Tame" and advertised as a "NASCAR Tradition", is a race track built for NASCAR racing located near Darlington, South Carolina. It is of a unique, somewhat egg-shaped design, an oval with the ends of very different configurations, a condition which supposedly arose from the proximity of one end of the track to a minnow pond the owner refused to relocate. This situation makes it very challenging for the crews to set up their cars' handling in a way that will be effective at both ends.

The track is a four-turn  oval. The track's first two turns are banked at twenty-five degrees, while the final two turns are banked two degrees lower at twenty-three degrees. The front stretch (the location of the finish line) and the back stretch is banked at six degrees. Darlington Raceway can seat up to 60,000 people.

Darlington has something of a legendary quality among drivers and older fans; this is probably due to its long track length relative to other NASCAR speedways of its era and hence the first venue where many of them became cognizant of the truly high speeds that stock cars could achieve on a long track. The track allegedly earned the moniker The Lady in Black because the night before the race the track maintenance crew would cover the entire track with fresh asphalt sealant, in the early years of the speedway, thus making the racing surface dark black. Darlington is also known as "The Track Too Tough to Tame" because drivers can run lap after lap without a problem and then bounce off of the wall the following lap. Racers will frequently explain that they have to race the racetrack, not their competition. Drivers hitting the wall are considered to have received their "Darlington Stripe" thanks to the missing paint on the right side of the car.

Race report
Seven cautions were waved for forty laps in front of 32,400 audience members. This race was constantly threatened to be postponed because of rain and was red flagged once because of actual rainfall. It took six hours, forty-two minutes, and thirty-seven seconds for the race to reach its conclusion, making it the longest Southern 500 ever; Fonty Flock was the winner. He would stop on the front straight, climb up on his hood and lead the entire crowd in singing his own version of the classic Southern American song Dixie.

Flock's uniform would consist of Bermuda shorts and argyle socks in addition to a pencil-thin moustache reminiscent of Clark Gable.

Total winnings for this race were $23,855 ($ when adjusted for inflation). Sixty-six drivers competed; all of them were born in the United States. Jim Paschal was the last place driver of the race; finishing in 66th with an engine problem on lap 18. Jimmy Ingram flipped his vehicle over on lap 91. In four attempts this was Tommy Thompson's best finish at Darlington. There were 12 different manufacturers in this race. Johnny Patterson's awesome 2nd place finish in his second start would prove to be his best in the Cup series. As well as the best finish for owner H.B. Ranier, father of Harry Ranier.

Ranier-Lundy Racing and Petty Enterprises were the only non-independent racing teams to show up for this race.

Tony Bonadies, Johnny Bridgers, Merritt Brown, Johnny Gouveia, Keith Hamner, Possum Jones, Pete Kelly, Banjo Matthews and Joe Weatherly made their NASCAR Grand National Series debut in this event. Roy Hall, Rudy Hires, Jimmy Ingram, Bill Miller, E. C. Ramsey and Rollin Smith would never race in professional stock car racing after this race. W. E. Baker, Al Conroy, Al Fleming and Herb Fry would make their only NASCAR appearances at this race. Red Vogt, Julian Buesink and B.B. Blackburn were the three notable crew chiefs at this event.

Finishing order
Section reference:

 Fonty Flock
 Johnny Patterson
 Herb Thomas
 Bub King
 Banjo Matthews
 Lee Petty
 Joe Eubanks
 Herschel Buchanan
 Buck Baker
 Ray Duhigg
 Jack Smith
 Rollin Smith
 Jimmy Thompson
 Speedy Thompson
 Lloyd Moore
 Joe Weatherly
 Buddy Shuman
 Keith Hammer
 Clyde Pittinger
 Pat Kirkwood
 Gene Comstock
 W.E. Baker
 Herb Fry
 Iggy Katona
 Dick Passwater
 Bill Miller
 Tony Bonadies
 Donald Thomas
 Bob Flock
 Erwin Blatt
 Ted Chamberlain
 Al Fleming
 Tim Flock
 E.C. Ramsey
 Dick Rathmann
 Al Conroy
 Coleman Lawrence
 Charles Weidler
 Rudy Hires
 Ralph Liguori
 Lamar Crabtree
 Johnny Bridgers
 Tommy Moon
 Bill Blair
 June Cleveland
 Joe Guide
 Possum Jones
 Roy Hall
 Fireball Roberts
 Jimmie Lewallen
 Pete Kelly
 Bobby Myers
 Bucky Sager
 Bob Pronger
 Larry Mann
 Weldon Adams
 Jimmy Ingram
 Gwyn Staley
 Johnny Gouveia
 Tommy Thompson
 Curtis Turner
 Gene Darragh
 Merritt Brown
 Slick Smith
 Clyde Minter
 Jim Paschal

Timeline
Section reference:
 Start of race: Fonty Flock has the pole position.
 Lap 18: Tommy Thompson took over the lead from Fonty Flock, Jim Paschal fell out with engine failure.
 Lap 21: Clyde Minter managed to lose the front end of his vehicle.
 Lap 22: Slick Smith's engine stopped functioning properly.
 Lap 28: Merritt Brown fell out with engine failure.
 Lap 32: Gene Darragh had a terminal crash.
 Lap 35: Curtis Turner had a terminal crash.
 Lap 37: Tommy Thompson fell out with engine failure.
 Lap 38: Fonty Flock takes over the lead from Tommy Thompson.
 Lap 61: Johnny Gouveia managed to overheat his vehicle's vital parts.
 Lap 74: Gwyn Staley managed to overheat his vehicle's vital parts.
 Lap 91: Jimmy Ingram caused a terminal crash by flipping his vehicle over.
 Lap 105: Dick Rathmann takes over the lead from Fonty Flock.
 Lap 125: Weldon Adams had a terminal crash.
 Lap 139: Larry Mann managed to lose the rear end of his vehicle.
 Lap 140: Fonty Flock takes over the lead from Dick Rathmann, Bob Pronger fell out with engine failure.
 Lap 142: Bucky Sager managed to lose his left front wheel while racing at high speeds.
 Lap 145: Bobby Myers fell out with engine failure.
 Lap 162: Pete Kelly fell out with engine failure.
 Lap 168: Jimmy Lewallen made his vehicle's engine nonfunctional.
 Lap 174: Fireball Roberts had a really nasty time with his vehicle's engine.
 Lap 181: Herb Thomas takes over the lead from Fonty Flock.
 Lap 182: Roy Hall managed to exhaust all of his vehicle's tires while running out of gas at the same time.
 Lap 185: Fonty Flock takes over the lead from Herb Thomas.
 Lap 193: Possum Jones managed to overheat his vehicle's vital parts.
 Lap 223: Bill Blair managed to overheat his vehicle's vital parts.
 Lap 240: Tommy Moon managed to overheat his vehicle's vital parts.
 Lap 244: Johnny Bridgers managed to overheat his vehicle's vital parts.
 Lap 254: Lamar Crabtree managed to blow a piston while he was racing.
 Lap 256: Ralph Liguori managed to overheat his vehicle's vital parts.
 Lap 315: Dick Rathmann had a terminal crash.
 Lap 321: Tim Flock had a terminal crash.
 Lap 383: Jimmy Thompson had a terminal crash.
 Finish: Fonty Flock was officially declared the winner of the event.

References

Southern 500
Southern 500
NASCAR races at Darlington Raceway